The 2001 Russian Figure Skating Championships took place in Moscow from December 26 to 29, 2000. Skaters competed in the disciplines of men's singles, ladies' singles, pair skating, and ice dancing. The results were one of the criteria used to pick the Russian teams to the 2001 World Championships and the 2001 European Championships.

This was also the 1st Russian Figure Skating Championships that National Anthem of Russia that was heard.

Senior results

Men

Ladies

Pairs

Ice dancing

External links
 results

2000 in figure skating
Russian Figure Skating Championships, 2001
Figure skating
Russian Figure Skating Championships